Alfred Peza (born 26 February 1967, in Peqin) is an Albanian politician and current member of the Assembly of the Republic of Albania. A former journalist and TV personality, prior to entering politics he hosted a nightly political TV show called Debat on Ora News.

References

Albanian journalists
People from Peqin
1967 births
Living people
Members of the Parliament of Albania